Gustavus is the Latinised form of the male given name Gustav or Gustaf, of likely Old Swedish origin, used mainly in Scandinavian countries, German-speaking countries, and the Low Countries, possibly meaning "staff of the Geats or Goths or gods", possibly derived from the Old Norse elements  ("Geats"), / ("Goths") or  ("gods"), and  ("staff"). This name has been borne by eight Kings of Sweden, including the 16th-century Gustav Vasa and the current king, Carl XVI Gustaf. It is a common name for Swedish monarchs since the reign of Gustav Vasa. The name has entered other languages as well. A side form of the name in Swedish is Gösta.

A-G
Gustavus Abeel (1801–1887), American pastor, missionary, and writer
Gustavus Adolphus (1594–1632), King of Sweden from 1611 to 1632
 Gustavus Adolphus Day, celebrating the king
 Gustavus Adolphus pastry, named for the king
 Gustavus Adolphus College, named for the king
Gustavus Adolphus of the Palatinate (1632–1641), last son of Frederick V, Elector Palatine
Gustavus Aird (1813–1898), Scottish minister of the Free Church of Scotland
Gustavus M. Blech (1870–1949), Russian-born American physician, surgeon, and medical educator
Gustavus Miller Bower (1790–1864), U.S. Representative from Missouri
Gustavus Brander (1720–1787), English naturalist
Gustavus Vaughan Brooke (1818–1866), Irish stage actor
Gustavus Richard Brown (1747–1804), friend of George Washington, physician, and botanist
Gustavus Conyngham (1747–1819), Irish-born American merchant sea captain
Gustavus Wynne Cook (1867–1940), American banker, businessman, and amateur astronomer
Gustavus Coulson (1879–1901), British Army officer and English recipient of the Victoria Cross
Gustavus Cox (1870–1958), Barbadian cricketer
Gustavus De Russy (1818–1891), U.S. Army career officer and American Civil War general
Gustavus Cheyney Doane (1840–1892), U.S. Army Cavalry Captain, explorer, and inventor
Gustavus Esselen (1888–1952), American chemist
Gustavus A. Finkelnburg (1837–1908), United States representative from Missouri and federal judge
Gustavus Fowke (1880–1946), English army officer and first-class cricketer
Gustavus Fox (1821–1883), U.S. Navy officer
Gustavus Richard Glenn (1848–1939), American academic
Gustavus Green (1865–1964), British engineer and contributor to the design of early aircraft engines

H-N
Gustavus Hamilton (disambiguation), various people
Gustavus Handcock (1693–1751), Irish politician
Gustavus Adolphus Henry Sr. (1804–1880), American politician who served as a Confederate States Senator from Tennessee
Gustavus Hesselius (1682–1755), Swedish-American painter
Gustavus Hines (1809–1873), American missionary
Gustavus Detlef Hinrichs (1836–1923), chemist and natural philosopher
Gustavus Holmes, builder of the Gustavus Holmes House
Gustavus Hume (1730–1812), president of the Royal College of Surgeons in Ireland
Gustavus Hume (British Army officer) (1826–1891), British Army soldier in the Crimean War
Gustavus Katterfelto (c. 1743–1799), Prussian conjurer, scientific lecturer, and quack
Gustavus Kelly (1901–1980), Irish cricketer
Gustavus Town Kirby (1874–1956), American sports administrator who was president of the Amateur Athletic Union 
Gustavus Loomis (1789–1872), U.S. Army officer
Gustavus Hindman Miller (1857–1929), prominent Tennessee merchant, manufacturer, financier, capitalist farmer, author
Gustavus Murray (1831–1887), British obstetrician
Gustavus Myers (1872–1942), American journalist and historian
Gustavus Myers Center for the Study of Bigotry and Human Rights, named for the journalist
Gustavus Myers Outstanding Book Award, named for the journalist
Gustavus Adolphus Neumann (1807−1886), German-born American newspaper publisher
Gustavus A. Northcott (1861–1938), Republican President of the West Virginia Senate
Gustavus Reinhold Nyländer (1776–1825), German Lutheran missionary and linguist who worked in Sierra Leone

O-Z
Gustavus Orr (1819–1887), early proponent of the public education system of the U.S. state of Georgia
Gustavus Pike (fl. 1880s), builder of the Gustavus and Sarah T. Pike House
Gustavus G. Prescott, Charleston merchant and builder of the Gustavus G. Prescott House
Gustavus Poznanski (1804–1879), South Carolina cantor and religious leader
Gustavus Schmidt (1795–1877), American lawyer and lecturer on Civil Law at the University of Louisiana
Gustavus Scott (1753–1800), American lawyer who served in legislative capacities in Maryland in the American Revolutionary War
Gustavus H. Scott (1812–1882), U.S. Navy officer
Gustavus Sessinghaus (1838–1887), U.S. Representative from Missouri
Gustavus Sidenberg (1843–1915), Jewish-American manufacturer and financier
Gustavus Simmons (born 1930), American cryptographer
Gustavus Smith (disambiguation), various people
Gustavus Sniper (1836–1894), German-born Union Army brevet brigadier general in the American Civil War
Gustavus Swan (1787–1860), Ohio lawyer and banker
Gustavus Franklin Swift (1839–1903), American business executive
Gustavus Talbot (1848–1920), British member of parliament and a Coalition Conservative politician
Gustavus Trask (1836–1914), governor of Sailors' Snug Harbor
Gustavus von Tempsky (1828–1868), Prussian adventurer, artist, newspaper correspondent, and soldier
Gustavus Waffelaert (1847–1931), 22nd bishop of Bruges in Belgium
Gustavus Waltz (fl. 1732–1759), German bass opera singer
Gustavus Athol Waterhouse (1877–1950), Australian entomologist
Gustavus Blin Wright (1830–1898), Canadian pioneer roadbuilder and entrepreneur

See also
Gustava, a feminine form
Gustavas Gvildys (fl. 1920s–1930s), Lithuanian footballer

Swedish masculine given names
Masculine given names
Germanic masculine given names
Latin masculine given names
Scandinavian masculine given names
Slavic masculine given names